Yaser Abdelaziz El Sayed is a Paralympian athlete from Egypt competing mainly in category F55-56 javelin throw events.

He competed in the 2008 Summer Paralympics in Beijing, China. There he won a bronze medal in the men's F55-56 javelin throw event.

External links
 

Paralympic athletes of Egypt
Athletes (track and field) at the 2008 Summer Paralympics
Paralympic bronze medalists for Egypt
Living people
Year of birth missing (living people)
Place of birth missing (living people)
Medalists at the 2008 Summer Paralympics
Paralympic medalists in athletics (track and field)
Egyptian male javelin throwers